The Fast Lane is an Australian television show that aired between 1985 (Season 1) and 1987 (Season 2) on the Australian Broadcasting Corporation (ABC).

It was created by John Clarke and Andrew Knight and starred Terry Bader, Richard Healy, Debra Lawrance and Peter Hosking.

According to Debra Lawrance on The Conversation Hour in ABC 774 radio 15 October 2015 (at about 26 mins into the file), the ABC taped over the master Umatic tapes.

ABC archives have advised (21 September 2021) that they hold copies of the entire series.

Plot Overview 
This comedy series follows two private investigators, Bryce (Terry Bader) and Ken (Richard Healy), who run a firm known as the "Excelsior Research Foundation". They are assisted by Pat (Debra Lawrance), their receptionist.

Bryce thinks he is smart and boasts about his elite private school background, but is actually very stupid and fails to understand what is really happening around him. He dropped out of law school in the second year. Ken is the down-to-earth blue-collar member of the team, but they both usually get into deep trouble. Pat is the sensible and smart one, but the others don't recognise this. She and Detective Sergeant Blair (Peter Hosking) usually rescue them and clean up after them.

The plots are a black comedy and satire. The agency is desperate for work and usually takes on small cases involving simple detective work (e.g. domestic disputes). Bryce and Ken stumble around trying to solve it - mostly when Bryce takes the obviously wrong approach - and getting deeper into trouble. 
Meanwhile Pat does the real detective work and uncovers a bigger crime that is linked to the small case (e.g. corporate crime). Although Pat discovers the real criminals, they often escape prosecution because of loopholes in the law or they are too powerful to touch. In the end, the simple case is wrapped up and Bryce undeservedly takes the credit for it. But the audience and Pat realise the injustice, because the wrapup usually results in the innocent becoming the victim and the real criminals getting way with it.

Production credits  
Producer: Noel Price

Directors: Colin Budds, Peter Dodds, Mark Joffe, Noel Price, Mandy Smith

Written by: Andrew Knight, John Clarke (and others)

Music: Greg Sneddon

Cast: Terry Bader, Douglas Stephen Grives, Robin Harrison, Richard Healy, Peter Hosking, Melita Jurisic, Nina Landis, Debra Lawrance, Denis Moore, Marilyn Rodgers, Ian  Shrives, Mary Sitarenos, Arna-Maria Winchester, William Zappa

Locations: All shows are shot in Melbourne

Episodes 
According to John Clarke's CV, there were 19 episodes in total.

Season 1 (1985) 
These episodes were run on ABC Channel 2 at 8:55pm on Thursday nights. A review in the Sydney Morning Herald mentions the episodes were to run on Fridays, but the ABC changed their mind, and ran the series on Thursdays instead. Note: all episodes of Series 1 are known to exist in the form of VHS Rips available online.

Season 2 (1987) 
These episodes were run on ABC Channel 2 on Tuesday nights at 9:20pm. Note: Episodes 1, 2 and 3 are NOT known to exist as VHS rips available online, whereas the others are.

References

External links

1985 Australian television series debuts
1987 Australian television series endings
Australian Broadcasting Corporation original programming